Eld or ELD may refer to:

People
 George Eld (died 1624), English printer
 George Eld (antiquary) (1791–1862), English antiquary
 Henry Eld (1814–1850), United States Navy officer and explorer
 Eld Martin (1886–1968), Canadian politician

Technology
 ELD glass, extraordinary low-dispersion glass
 Electroluminescent display
 Electronic logging device

Other
 Eld (album), by Norwegian band Enslaved
 Economics of Land Degradation Initiative, promotes sustainable land use globally 
 acronym for English Language Development, any teaching program for English Language Learners
 Fire (Elfgren and Strandberg novel)
 Old age
 South Arkansas Regional Airport at Goodwin Field
 Union of People's Democracy, a defunct political party in Greece

See also 
 Elder (disambiguation)